Vô Tranh may refer to several places in Vietnam, including:

 Vô Tranh, Bắc Giang, a rural commune of Lục Nam District.
 , a rural commune of Hạ Hòa District.
 , a rural commune of Phú Lương District.